Tunisie Telecom is the incumbent telecom operator in Tunisia. Tunisie Telecom has more than 6 million subscribers in the fixed and mobile telephony, in Tunisia and abroad. It also plays an important role in improving the rate of internet penetration in Tunisia, which allowed it to eventually have 140,000 subscribers at the end of April 2008.

Tunisie Telecom became a European telecoms operator with its 60% share purchase of the Maltese telecommunications company GO from the Emirati EIT for €200 million in June 2016.

In December 2021, the Malagasy group Axian, led by Hassanein Hiridjee, made the highest bid among potential buyers for Mauritanian telecom operator Mattel, a subsidiary of Tunisie Telecom. His proposal would be around 100 million euros (DTH 326,106,511.50).

External links 
 Official website

References

1995 establishments in Tunisia
Telecommunications companies established in 1995
Telecommunications companies of Tunisia
Economy of Tunis
Tunisian brands
Government-owned telecommunications companies
Government-owned companies of Tunisia